The Art of Touring is the first DVD released by the American, metal band Shadows Fall. It was released in 2005 through Century Media Records. The DVD features live concert, backstage, and behind-the-scenes footage shot throughout the United States, Europe, and Japan from 2002 to 2004. The DVD also includes the six music videos from The Art of Balance and The War Within albums.

Scene selection

Main Feature
Introduction
Tell us how you really feel
"Thoughts Without Words" (live)
"Destroyer of Senses" (live)
"The Idiot Box" (live)
"Of One Blood" (live)
"The First Noble Truth" (live)
"Stepping Outside the Circle" (live)
"A Fire in Babylon" (live)
"Fleshold" (live)
Walk: A tribute to Dimebag Darrell (live, featuring Damageplan)

Shenanigans
12. Destruction on the road!

Music Videos
13. "Thoughts Without Words"
14. "Destroyer of Senses"
15. "The Idiot Box"
16. "The Power of I and I"
17. "What Drives the Weak"
18. "Inspiration on Demand"

Bonus Feature
19. "Live Wire" (Mötley Crüe cover, live)
20. "Teasn' Pleasn'" (Dangerous Toys cover, live, featuring Jason McMaster)

Credits

Musicians
 Brian Fair – Vocals
 Matthew Bachand – Guitar and Vocals
 Jonathan Donais – Lead Guitar and Vocals
 Paul Romanko – Bass
 Jason Bittner – Drums

DVD production
 Executive production by Matt Bachand and Jason Bittner
 Videography, editing, and co-production by Zach Merck and Joe Natale
 Authoring and co-production by Video Transfer and Colleen Hackenson
 Footage shot by Matt Bachand, Jason Bittner, Dumbboy, Matt Earl ( Reign of Fury ), El Duce, Willie Gee, Steve Joh, Zack Merck, Joe Natale, Ponyboy, and Trent Weller

Other credits
 Art direction, design and layout by Tom Bejgrowicz
 Front cover and booklet live photography by Will Hawkins II
 Back cover photography by Reverend Dave Ciancio, Will Hawkins II and more
 "Destroyer of False Metal" and "SF" graphics by Don Naylor for Endicott/EVR

External links
 Shadows Fall - official website
 Century Media Records - official website

Shadows Fall video albums